Domenico Grasso (born 1955) is an American engineer, professor and the sixth chancellor of the University of Michigan–Dearborn. He has previously served as provost of the University of Delaware, vice president for research and dean of two different colleges at the University of Vermont. Grasso is Smith College's Picker Engineering Program's founding director.

Early life and education 
Grasso was born in Worcester, Massachusetts, on November 16, 1955, to Ciriaco Grasso, who immigrated from Ariano Irpino (Italy) and Tommasina Grasso who immigrated from Vieste (Italy).

He attended college on an Army Reserve Officers' Training Corps scholarship and holds a Bachelor of Science from Worcester Polytechnic Institute, Master of Science in civil engineering from Purdue University, and a Ph.D. from the University of Michigan.

Grasso is a veteran of the United States Army, serving from 1977 to 1990, and resigned his commission as a major. He received awards that included the Army Service Ribbon, Army Overseas Reserve Components Training Ribbon, Army Commendation Medal and Army Parachutist Badge. He deployed as part of two REFORGERS, Certain Sentinel (1986) and Certain Challenge (1988).

Academic career 
Grasso joined the faculty of the University of Connecticut's Department of Civil and Environmental Engineering in 1989. He later served as department head from 1998 to 2000. During 1996, Grasso was a visiting scholar at UC Berkeley.

In 2000, he declined a chair position at Columbia University to become the Smith College's Rosemary Bradford Hewlett Professor, where he became the Picker Engineering Program's first director, the United States' first women's college engineering program. While there, he collaborated with astronaut Sally Ride on TOYChallenge, a nationwide toy design event that encouraged STEM learning for middle school students.

In 2005, Grasso was named the University of Vermont's dean of the College of Engineering and Mathematical Sciences and later served as vice president for research and dean of the Graduate College. While at UVM, he established the university-wide Complex Systems Center and initiated efforts to broaden engineering education to more intentionally include the liberal arts and social sciences, including the creation of a B.A. program in engineering and a B.S. in engineering science.

Grasso began his appointment as provost at the University of Delaware in 2013. While in office, he created the Division of Enrollment Management and Institute for Financial Services Analytics. He also played a major role in new university programs in the humanities, arts, social sciences and entrepreneurship.

On February 15, 2018, Grasso was named the University of Michigan–Dearborn's sixth chancellor, beginning August 1, 2018. On February 16, 2023, The Board of Regents voted unanimously to reappoint him to a second term.  He is the first University of Michigan alum to lead the university and is also a professor of public policy and sustainable engineering. In addition to being chief executive officer of the UM-Dearborn campus, he is an executive officer of the University of Michigan (Ann Arbor | Dearborn | Flint). 

Among the honors and awards received by Grasso are the AWWA National Doctoral Dissertation Award; being elected Fellow of the Association of Environmental Engineering and Science Professors; the Association for Environmental Health and Sciences Foundation
Career Achievement Award; the John Cabot University Education Excellence Award; the Robert H. Goddard Alumni Award for Outstanding Professional Achievement, WPI; the Water Environment Federation Disinfection Pioneer Award.

Scholarship and research 
Grasso's research focuses on how contaminants change and move in the environment over time, as well as processes to reduce their impacts on nature and human health. He has also written extensively on the intersection of engineering education with the liberal arts and social sciences.

He has authored or co-authored hundreds of journal articles, essays and reports, and was editor-in-chief of the journal Environmental Engineering Science. He is the co-editor and chief contributor to the book Holistic Engineering Education: Beyond Technology (Springer 2010). He has also authored the book Hazardous Waste Site Remediation (Routledge 1993) and co-edited the book Hazardous Waste Management (UNESCO-ELOSS 2009).

Grasso has held a variety of distinguished posts in the environmental engineering and science fields, including fellow on the NATO Committee on the Challenges of Modern Society, technical expert to the United Nations Industrial Development Organization, vice chair of the Science Advisory Board for the United States Environmental Protection Agency and president of the AEESP.

Grasso, a member of a World Bank-funded international team that started the first environmental engineering program in Argentina, also chaired the National Academies of Sciences, Engineering, and Medicine committee that authored Environmental Engineering for the 21st Century: Addressing Grand Challenges and testified before the Congress of the Republic of Peru on sustainable development in Latin America.

Personal life 
Grasso is married to the former Susan Jean Hull, a University of Michigan engineering alumna who also has a Ph.D. from the Biden School of Public Policy at the University of Delaware, with whom he has four adult children: Benjamin, Jacob, Elspeth and Caitlin.

References

External links 
 UM–Dearborn biography

1955 births
Living people
Purdue University College of Engineering alumni
University of Michigan College of Engineering alumni
Smith College faculty
University of California, Berkeley staff
University of Vermont faculty
University of Delaware faculty
21st-century American engineers
Fellows of the Association of Environmental Engineering and Science Professors